Cor Dekker (born 9 October 1987) is a  Dutch-born Norwegian semi-professional darts player who plays in the Professional Darts Corporation events.

Career
Dekker partnered with Robert Wagner in the 2016 PDC World Cup of Darts, and after beating Gibraltar in the first round, they took on the Scotland team of Gary Anderson and Robert Thornton. After taking Anderson to a last leg decider in the singles, Dekker needed 52 to win, but Anderson took out a 160 checkout to win the match.

Dekker made his PDC European Tour debut on the 2019 Austrian Darts Championship, but lost to Dietmar Burger in the first round 6–3. He then qualified for the 2019 Gibraltar Darts Trophy, where he lost 6–5 to Dyson Parody, after being 5–2 up and missing multiple match darts.

References

External links

1987 births
Living people
Norwegian darts players
Professional Darts Corporation associate players
PDC World Cup of Darts Norwegian team